Zobaida Hannan (14 November 1945 – 22 November 2011) was a Bangladeshi social worker. She was awarded Ekushey Padak in 2004 by the Government of Bangladesh for her contribution to social activities.

Social activities

Hannan worked into converting Asharkota village, Nangalkot Upazila, Comilla District into a self-reliant locality. She served as the General Secretary of Comilla unit of Bangladesh Jatiya Andha Kallyan Samity (BJAKS) and the President of Child Sight Foundation (CSF).

Awards
 Ekushey Padak (2004)
 Rotary SEED Award 2004-2005
 Anannya Award (2006)

References

1945 births
2011 deaths
Bangladeshi social workers
Recipients of the Ekushey Padak
People from Mirsharai Upazila